Keith Dodgshun (31 July 1893 – 12 May 1971) was a politician in Victoria, Australia. He was a member of the Victorian Legislative Assembly for just under 17 years, representing the electorates of Ouyen and Rainbow for the Country Party from 1938 to 1955.

Early life
Dodgshun was born in the inner Melbourne suburb of Hawthorn to warehouse manager Frederick William Dodgshun and his English wife Rosa May Russell. He was educated at Camberwell Grammar School and the Burnley Agricultural College. He managed his family's property at Mount Egerton for several years before enlisting in the army.

Military service
Dodgshun enlisted in the Australian Imperial Force on 7 November 1917, He was assigned to the 1st Field Artillery Brigade and stationed in France and Belgium during World War I. He was discharged from the army on 31 March 1919.

On his return to Australia, Dodgshun settled in Hopetoun where he worked in the soldier settlement scheme.

Political career
In 1922, Dodgshun joined the Country Party and became president of the party's Hopetoun branch. From 1933 to 1938, he was a local councillor in the Shire of Karkarooc, until he nominated for election to the lower house of the Victorian state parliament.

Dodgshun was elected unopposed to the Victorian Legislative Assembly as the only candidate to nominate for the vacancy in Ouyen caused by the departure of Albert Bussau who had resigned to become Victoria's Agent-General in London, so the by-election scheduled for 5 May 1938 was not held.

Dodgshun was first made a minister when he was made Chief Secretary in Thomas Hollway's first ministry, until the coalition between the Liberal and Country parties was dissolved after a dispute between Hollway and Country leader John McDonald.

On 27 June 1950, with the support of the Labor Party, McDonald overthrew Hollway's government and was appointed Premier of Victoria. Dodgshun was made Deputy Premier, Chief Secretary, Minister-in-Charge of Electrical Undertakings and Minister-in-Charge of Immigration. Hollway briefly regained power from 28 to 31 October 1952 as an independent Premier, but his commission was withdrawn by the Governor of Victoria and Dodgshun regained his ministries in McDonald's cabinet, however McDonald was defeated by John Cain's Labor Party less than two months later at the 1952 Victorian state election.

References

|-

|-

|-

|-

Members of the Victorian Legislative Assembly
Deputy Premiers of Victoria
Australian Army soldiers
Australian military personnel of World War I
National Party of Australia members of the Parliament of Victoria
1893 births
1971 deaths
20th-century Australian politicians
People from Hawthorn, Victoria
Military personnel from Melbourne
Politicians from Melbourne